The 1940 Miami Hurricanes football team represented the University of Miami as a member of the Southern Intercollegiate Athletic Association (SIAA) in the 1940 college football season. The Hurricanes played their nine home games at  Burdine Stadium in Miami, Florida. The team was led by fourth-year head coach Jack Harding and finished with a  unranked in the AP poll.

Schedule

References

Miami
Miami Hurricanes football seasons
Miami Hurricanes football